Ahmed Moallim Fiqi is a politician from Somalia. He is currently a member of the Somali Federal Parliament. From May 2011 to March 2013, he served as Director of the National Intelligence and Security Agency (NISA). After resigning from the position, he was provisionally replaced by Abdikarin Dahir.

In 2015, Ahmed Moallim Fiqi run for the office of President of Galmudug State. Ahmed lost to his contender Abdikarim Hussein Guled Guled won by 49 to 40 votes over former Intel. Chief Ahmed Moallim Fiqi.

Early life and education 
Fiqi was born in 1971 in Galkayo, Somalia, His family hailed from the Sa'ad Habargidir clan. Fiqi took his primary and secondary school in Mogadishu. In 1988, after his two-year Military service he was admitted for the College of Law at the Somali National University. Fiqi didn't complete his studies due to the Somali Civil War. He then went Sudan and studied agriculture at the University of Khartoum. Fiqi is a graduate of International Islamic University Malaysia.

Fiqi speaks Somali, Arabic, Italian, and English.

Political career 
 
Ahmed Fiqi started his political career during the Islamic Courts Union. He was very close friend of former ICU leader Sharif Sheikh Ahmed. Later when Sharif Sheikh Ahmed become president, Fiqi served as the Somali ambassador to Sudan from 2010–2011. He was served as Director General of the National Intelligence and Security Agency and Presidential Candidate for the Galmudug State of Somalia.

In the early 2015, Ahmed Fiqi co-founded Daljir Party with Sharif Sheikh Ahmed and Hassan Moalim.  Later Ahmed Fiqi run for the office of President of Galmudug State. He lost to his contender Abdikarim Hussein Guled Guled won by 49 to 40 votes over former Intelligence Chief Ambassador Ahmed Moallim Fiqi.

In November 28, 2016, Ahmed Moalim Fiqi was elected as member of the Federal Parliament of Somalia from Galmudug in Adado, Somalia.

Fiqi's Daljir Party formed a coalition with former Somali President Hassan Mohamud's Peace and Development Party. They launched Union for Peace and Development Party in October 2018.

References

Living people
Somalian politicians
Place of birth missing (living people)
1971 births